Gora Ulun (Mount Ulun) is a mountain in Khabarovsk Krai ( Eastern Siberia), Russia and officially the highest point of the Badzhal Range (Баджа́льский хребет) with an elevation of .

Geography
The Badzhal Range where the peak rises is a mountain chain with a length of approximately 220 kilometers. The mountains are quite deserted and the infrastructure is undeveloped in the area.

Elevations
After the breakdown of the Soviet Union topographic maps reduced the elevation to 2,221 m.

See also
List of mountains and hills of Russia
Berill Mountain

References

Ulun